The DC class was a class of diesel locomotives in New Zealand and Tasmania. Originally built by General Motors Canada and Clyde Engineering between 1955 and 1967 as New Zealand Government Railways DA class locomotive. Eighty-five DAs were rebuilt as the DC class locomotive.
Tranz Rail, a successor of the NZGR, sold DC 4588 to AN Tasrail. It has since been scrapped.

Introduction and service
Due to a locomotive shortage due to the planned replacement of AN Tasrails English Electric locomotive fleet, Tranz Rail shipped DC 4588 to Tasmania on a one-year lease. The locomotive left Wellington on 8 December 1998 on the Arktis Dream, and arrived in Bell Bay, Tasmania on 15 December 1998. The locomotives were later sold to Tasrail. Due to the DC being in a non standard nature, low tractive effort and having a small fuel capacity, the loco was restricted to the Bell Bay Line, until Easter 1999 where it has since ventured out on the Western and Melba Lines, while still operating in Tranz Rails Cato Blue livery, but with the "Tranz Rail" lettering replaced with "Tasrail" lettering.

Withdrawal and disposal
DC 4588 was placed into storage in October 2002 after suffering an engine problem. Rebuilding commenced on the locomotive in 2005 at East Tamar Workshops. The rebuilding included lowering the short-hood, replacing the big front cab window with two smaller ones, and a front cab door on the non-assistants side. By 2008, the rebuilding had stopped and was again placed into long-term storage, until being scrapped in 2011.

Class register

See also

 New Zealand DA class locomotive
 New Zealand DC class locomotive

References

Clyde Engineering locomotives
Diesel locomotives of Tasmania
Railway locomotives introduced in 1978
3 ft 6 in gauge locomotives of Australia
Diesel-electric locomotives of New Zealand
A1A-A1A locomotives
3 ft 6 in gauge locomotives of New Zealand
Diesel-electric locomotives of Australia